Fiete Sykora (born 16 September 1982) is a retired German footballer who played as a striker.

Career
Sykora made his debut on the professional league level in the 2. Bundesliga for FC Carl Zeiss Jena on 11 August 2006 when starting in a game against Kickers Offenbach.

External links
 
 
 Profile at fupa.net

1982 births
Living people
People from Wismar
People from Bezirk Rostock
German footballers
Footballers from Mecklenburg-Western Pomerania
Association football forwards
2. Bundesliga players
3. Liga players
FC Carl Zeiss Jena players
FC Erzgebirge Aue players
VfL Osnabrück players
Holstein Kiel players
SC Weiche Flensburg 08 players